Italy participated in the Eurovision Song Contest 2014 in Copenhagen, Denmark. Their entry was selected internally by the Italian broadcaster Radiotelevisione italiana (RAI). Emma represented Italy with the song "La mia città". In the final, Italy placed 21st, scoring 33 points.

Background 

Prior to the 2014 contest, Italy had participated in the Eurovision Song Contest forty times since its first entry during the inaugural contest in 1956. Since then, Italy has won the contest on two occasions: in 1964 with the song "Non ho l'età" performed by Gigliola Cinquetti and in 1990 with the song "Insieme: 1992" performed by Toto Cutugno. Italy has withdrawn from the Eurovision Song Contest a number of times with their most recent absence spanning from 1998 until 2010. Their return in 2011 with the song "Madness of Love", performed by Raphael Gualazzi, placed second—their highest result, to this point, since their victory in 1990. The nation saw further success in 2012 and 2013, placing ninth and seventh, respectively.

The Italian broadcaster for the 2014 Contest, who broadcast the event in Italy and organised the selection process for its entry, was RAI. Italy has previously organised national finals and internal selections to select their Eurovision entry. Between 2011 and 2013, the broadcaster used the Sanremo Music Festival as an artist selection pool where a special committee would select one of the competing artist, independent of the results in the competition, as the Eurovision entrant. The selected entrant was then responsible for selecting the song they would compete with. This method was again used for 2014.

Before Eurovision
On 22 January 2014, RAI announced that they had internally selected Emma Marrone to represent Italy in the Eurovision Song Contest 2014. On 24 January 2014, RAI revealed that Emma would perform "La mia città" at the Eurovision Song Contest 2014.

At Eurovision

As a member of the "Big Five", Italy automatically qualified for a place in the final, held on 10 May 2014. In addition to their participation in the final, Italy was assigned to vote in the second semi-final on 8 May 2014. During the Italian delegation's press conference on 6 May 2014, Italy was allocated to compete in the second half of the final. In the final, the producers of the show decided that Italy would perform 16th, following Russia and preceding Slovenia.

Italy placed 21st in the final out of 26, scoring 33 points. This represented one of the lowest placements in Italy's Eurovision Song Contest history – its lowest ever by absolute finishing position, but not its lowest relative finish or score (having previously finished 17th and joint-last with 0 points in the 1966 contest with Domenico Modugno's "Dio, come ti amo").

On stage, Emma was joined by two guitarists, one keyboard player, one drummer and one backing vocalist, Arianna Mereu. The Italian performance is based on a concept of glam rock from the 70s combined with futuristic elements.

In Italy, the broadcast of the first and second semi-finals aired on Rai 4 with commentary by Marco Ardemagni and Filippo Solibello, while the final aired on Rai 2 with commentary by Linus and Nicola Savino. The Italian spokesperson revealing the result of the Italian vote in the final was Linus.

Voting

Points awarded to Italy

Points awarded by Italy

Detailed voting results
The following members comprised the Italian jury:
  (jury chairperson)Vice president Talent & Music of MTV Italy
 Andrea Laffranchijournalist
 singer
 songwriter, composer, musician
 Francesco Pasqueromusic manager

References

2014
Countries in the Eurovision Song Contest 2014
Eurovision
Eurovision
Articles containing video clips